The 1980 CONCACAF Champions' Cup was the 16th edition of the CONCACAF Champions' Cup, the premier football club competition organized by CONCACAF, the regional governing body of North America, Central America, and the Caribbean.

UNAM won the final round, becoming CONCACAF club champions for the first time in their history.

Teams
The following 18 teams (from ten associations) qualified for the tournament.
North American Zone: 5 teams (from three associations)
Central American Zone: 8 teams (from four associations)
Caribbean Zone: 6 teams (from six associations)

North America Zone

Central America Zone

Caribbean Zone

Format
The teams were split into 3 zones (North American, Central American and Caribbean), each one qualifying the winner to the final tournament, that was played in Tegucigalpa, Honduras under a group system. All the qualifying matches in the tournament were played under the home/away match system.

Schedule

North America Zone

First round
The first leg was played on 22 June, and the second leg was played on 29 June 1980.

UNAM advanced to the third round after Sacramento Gold withdrew from the competition

Brooklyn Dodgers won 3–2 on aggregate; advanced to the second round.

Second round
The first leg was played on 10 September, and the second leg was played on 13 September 1980.

Cruz Azul won 12–3 on aggregate; advanced to the third round.

Third round
The first leg was played on 6 November, and the second leg was played on 13 November 1980.

UNAM won 4–1 on aggregate; advanced to the final round.

Central America Zone

First round
The first legs were played on 20 and 22 May and 4 June, and the second legs were played on 29 May, and 11 and 15 June 1982.

UNAH advanced to the third round after protesting the drawing of lots; which originally saw Cobán Imperial advance.

Santiagueño advanced to the third round after Cartaginés withdrew from the competition

Comunicaciones won 5–2 on aggregate.

Marathón won 4–3 on aggregate.

Second round
The first legs were played on 21 and 24 September, and the second legs were played on 24 and 28 September 1980.

Marathón won 5–1 on aggregate.

UNAH won 5–3 on aggregate.

Third round
The first leg was played on 26 December, and the second leg was played on 26 December 1980.

UNAH won 1–0 on aggregate.

Caribbean Zone

First round
The first legs were played on 8 and 22 June, and the second legs were played on 22 and 29 June 1980.

Robinhood won 5–2 on aggregate.

Transvaal won 4–2 on aggregate.

Second round
The first legs were played 2 November, and the second legs were played on 16 and 19 November 1980.

Transvaal won 5–0 on aggregate.

Robinhood won 4–3 on aggregate.

Third round
The first leg was played on 14 December, and the second leg was played on 21 December 1980.

Robinhood won 1–0 on aggregate.

Final round
All matches were played in Tegucigalpa.

Notes

References

c
CONCACAF Champions' Cup